The Cathedral of Saint Mary of the Assumption, also known locally as Saint Mary's Cathedral, is the principal church of the Roman Catholic Archdiocese of San Francisco in San Francisco, California. It is the mother church of the Catholic faithful in the California counties of Marin, San Francisco and San Mateo and is the metropolitan cathedral for the Ecclesiastical province of San Francisco.

The cathedral is located in the Cathedral Hill neighborhood of San Francisco. The present cathedral replaced one (1891–1962) of the same name. The original Cathedral of Saint Mary of the Immaculate Conception was built in 1853–1854 and still stands today. It is now known as Old Saint Mary's Cathedral.

Second cathedral

In 1883, Archbishop Patrick W. Riordan purchased the northwest corner of Van Ness Avenue and O'Farrell Street in Western Addition. Riordan broke ground in December 1885. On May 1, 1887, the archbishop placed the cornerstone. Archbishop Riordan dedicated the edifice to Saint Mary of the Assumption on January 11, 1891. The second cathedral served the Archdiocese of San Francisco for seventy-one years. During the episcopal terms of archbishops Riordan, Edward J. Hanna and John J. Mitty. Papal Secretary of State Eugenio Cardinal Pacelli, (future Pope Pius XII) said Mass at the high altar in October 1936. On April 3, 1962, Joseph T. McGucken was installed as the fifth Archbishop of San Francisco in the cathedral on Van Ness Avenue. Five months later the landmark was destroyed by arson on the night of September 7, 1962.

Rectors of the cathedral from 1891 to present
 John J. Prendergast, vicar general, 1891–1913
 Charles Augustus Ramm, 1914–1948
 Hugh Aloysius Donohoe, vicar general, 1948–1962
 Thomas J. Bowe, 1962–1980 
 J. O’Shaughnessy, administrator, 1979–1981, rector 1981–1986
 Patrick Joseph McGrath, 1986–1989
 Milton T Walsh, 1989–1997
 John O’Connor, 1997–2002
 Angel Jose De Heredia, administrator, 2002–2003
 John Talesfore, 2005–2015
 William J. Justice, administrator, 2015
 Arturo Albano, 2015–2022
 Kevin Kennedy, 2022–present

New cathedral: 1971
The present cathedral was commissioned just as Vatican II was convening in Rome. Monsignor Thomas J. Bowe served as first rector of the new cathedral from 1962 to 1980. The cornerstone was laid on December 13, 1967, and the cathedral was completed three years later. On May 5, 1971, the cathedral was blessed and on October 5, 1996, was formally dedicated to the Blessed Virgin Mary under the name of Saint Mary of the Assumption. The first Papal Mass was celebrated by Pope John Paul II in the cathedral in 1987.

It ran the private all-female Cathedral High School, in a building adjoined to the present-day cathedral itself. CHS merged with nearby all-male private Sacred Heart High School in 1987. St. Mary's Cathedral still has close ties to the resulting Sacred Heart Cathedral Preparatory, which uses the cathedral as its principal church for masses and other special events, such as graduation. Junipero Serra High School in San Mateo also uses the cathedral to hold graduation.

Design
The 1971 cathedral was designed by local architects John Michael Lee, Paul A. Ryan and Angus McSweeney,
collaborating with internationally known architects Pier Luigi Nervi and Pietro Belluschi, then the Dean of the School of Architecture at MIT. Precast concrete work, which is the entire top portion of the building, was constructed by Terracon and the DiRegolo Family of Hayward, CA.

Its saddle roof is composed of eight segments of hyperbolic paraboloids, in such a fashion that the bottom horizontal cross section of the roof is a square and the top cross section is a cross.

The design process was controversial. A preliminary design reminded one critic of "the effort of a camel and donkey to mate." After adding Belluschi and Nervi to the team, the situation improved, though the architects were then accused of plagiarizing the design of the St. Mary's Cathedral in Tokyo that was completed several years earlier. The modern design was not loved by San Francisco's Catholics who had previously worshipped in traditional churches. The church is commonly known as Our Lady of Maytag, because the roof (designed to look like a conquistador's helmet) resembles a washing machine agitator.

The building was selected in 2007 by the local chapter of the American Institute of Architects for a list of San Francisco's top 25 buildings. In 2017, Architecture Digest named it one of the 10 most beautiful churches in the United States.

Interior photos

See also

List of Catholic cathedrals in the United States
List of cathedrals in the United States
Roman Catholic Marian churches

References

External links

Official Cathedral Site
Roman Catholic Archdiocese of San Francisco Official Site
Cathedral of Saint Mary of the Assumption via the Archdiocese of San Francisco
Sacred Heart Cathedral Preparatory
Cathedrals of California

Roman Catholic churches in San Francisco
Concrete shell structures
Modernist architecture in California
Landmarks in San Francisco
Pietro Belluschi buildings
San Francisco
Mary of the Assumption, Cathedral of Saint
Religious organizations established in 1891
Roman Catholic churches completed in 1971
Western Addition, San Francisco
Cathedrals in San Francisco
20th-century Roman Catholic church buildings in the United States
Pier Luigi Nervi buildings